Cardboard Cavalier is a 1948 British historical comedy film directed by Walter Forde and starring Sid Field, Margaret Lockwood and Jerry Desmonde.

It was the last film for Forde and Field. Field died of a heart attack shortly after the film was released.

Plot
In an England under the rule of Oliver Cromwell, London barrow boy Sidcup Buttermeadow is unwittingly used as a spy for the exiled Charles II to deliver messages to his royalist supporters, and is aided by the object of his affection, Nell Gwynn.

Dressed as a Cavalier, Sidcup is pursued by Roundhead troops, but evades them with the help of a variety of people and a ghost.

When Charles is eventually restored as king, Sid is knighted and gets to kiss Nell Gwynn.

Cast
 Sid Field as Sidcup Buttermeadow
 Margaret Lockwood as Nell Gwynne
 Jerry Desmonde as Colonel Lovelace
 Jack McNaughton as Uriah Group
 Brian Worth as Tom Pride
 Edmund Willard as Oliver Cromwell
 Mary Clare as Milady Doverhouse
 Alfie Dean as Murdercasket
 Anthony Hulme as Charles II
 Miles Malleson as Judge Gorebucket
 Irene Handl as the ghost of Lady Agnes
 Joan Young as Maggie
 Claude Hulbert as Sylvester Clutterbuck
 Michael Brennan as Brother Barebones
 Peter Bull as Mosspot
 Vincent Holman as Lord Doverhouse
 John Salew as Smug

Production
The film was part of an ambitious production programme from J. Arthur Rank to meet an increased quota for British films. His intent was to make 60 over 12 months.

Sid Field's casting was announced in June 1948. He made the movie after a six-month tour of the US. Field's first film, London Town, had been a big flop but his popularity on stage encouraged Rank to try him again in films.

Pat Roc was meant to play the role of Nell Gwynn but reportedly turned it down and was replaced by Margaret Lockwood, who was keen to play comedy again after making a number of dramas. Field's son was born during filming on 5 August.

Filming started in June 1948. It was made at Denham Studios. Production of the film was interrupted by a strike from crew members in protest over recent sackings of film workers.  Cast member Alfie Dean died as the result of an off-set accident during the period of filming.

Filming ended in January 1949. Lockwood wrote in her memoirs that "we had a romp of a time with Sid Field."

Reception
The film was a critical and box-office disappointment.

"I was terribly distressed when I read the press notices of the film", wrote Lockwood.

Filmink stated the film "sounded like the sort of fun romp Bob Hope made so successfully...But those Hope vehicles were made by people who knew what they were doing...the makers of Cardboard Cavalier seem hopelessly out of their depth, including (it must be admitted) Lockwood who isn’t very good, mostly because she tries to be funny – forgetting that in her earlier comedies she was more the straight person."

Some reviews have been much more positive. The critic Derek Winnert noted that the film was "well timed, sprightly and funny, and exuberantly played by a welcome vintage cast, as well as amusingly written by Noel Langley and nicely directed by the comedy expert Forde." Variety spoke of Langley's script "blend[ing] comedy, bathos and sheer slapstick with skill and ingenuity" and also highlighted Lockwood as playing her role with "great gusto...verve and vivacity".

The film was banned in Syria in 1953.

References

External links
 
Cardboard Cavalier at Britmovie
Review of film at Variety

1949 films
Films directed by Walter Forde
1940s historical comedy films
British historical comedy films
Films shot at Denham Film Studios
Films set in London
Films set in the 1650s
British black-and-white films
Films with screenplays by Noel Langley
Cultural depictions of Charles II of England
Cultural depictions of Oliver Cromwell
1940s English-language films
1940s British films